Les Goodman (born September 1, 1950) was a former running back in the National Football League (NFL). He played professionally for the Atlanta Falcons and the Green Bay Packers.

Early life
Goodman was born Leslie Edward Goodman Jr. in Port Jefferson, New York, and graduated from Port Jefferson High School. He played college football at Yankton College, where he was a teammate of future All-Pro defensive end Lyle Alzado.

Career
Goodman was drafted in the third round of the 1972 NFL Draft by the Atlanta Falcons. He played two seasons with the Green Bay Packers.

See also
List of Green Bay Packers players

References

External links
 Pro-Football-Reference.Com
 databaseFootball.com

1950 births
Living people
People from Port Jefferson, New York
Green Bay Packers players
American football running backs
Yankton Greyhounds football players
Players of American football from New York (state)